European University of Lefke (EUL) is an institution of higher learning located in the Northern Cyprus  (de facto state ) Nicosia District town of Lefka, overlooking Morphou Bay.  Founded in 1989 by Cyprus Science Foundation, the university opened in 1990 as a member of the Balkan Universities Network, and offers 77 undergraduate and school programs and 38 postgraduate and doctoral degree programs which are approved by Turkey's Council of Higher Education (YÖK).

References

Universities in Northern Cyprus
Engineering universities and colleges
Technical universities and colleges in Cyprus
Education in Northern Cyprus
Educational organisations based in Northern Cyprus
1989 establishments in Northern Cyprus
Lefke District